(Abraham) Lockett Ford  (3 April 1853, in Newry – 16 April 1945, in Ardee) was an Irish Anglican clergyman.

Irwin was educated at the Royal Institution School, Liverpool and Trinity College, Oxford.  He was ordained deacon in 1876 and priest in 1878. He was an Assistant Master at his old school then Curate at Dundalk. He was Rector of Camlough from 1878 to 1893; and then of Ardee. He was Rural Dean of Athirdee from 1900 until 1925, and then of Drogheda until 1934. Ford became Archdeacon of Armagh in 1934; and held the post until his death. He was additionally Chaplain to the last four Lords Lieutenant of Ireland.

Arms

References

1853 births
People educated at the Royal Institution School
Alumni of Trinity College Dublin
Archdeacons of Armagh
19th-century Irish Anglican priests
20th-century Irish Anglican priests
1945 deaths